The John McKeon was a 19th-century New Jersey pilot boat built in 1838 by Webb & Allen for the New Jersey Pilots Association. She helped transport maritime pilots between inbound or outbound ships coming into the New York Harbor. Her short career ended in 1839, when the John McKeon was shipwrecked in a hurricane that swept the New York coast. The pilot boat Gratitude was lost in the same storm.

Construction and service 

John McKeon or John McKean was a two-masted New Jersey Pilot Boat, launched on November 24, 1838, for a company of New Jersey pilots who were licensed with the New Jersey Pilots' Association. She was valued at $9,000 and had no insurance. Her builders were the Webb & Allen shipyard located at the foot of 6th Street, New York (East River).

The John McKean'''s dimensions were 78.0 ft. in length; 21.0 ft. breadth of beam; 7.0 ft. depth of hold; and 104-tons.

End of service

On August 28, 1839, the John McKeon was lost in a severe storm with four crewmen; the rest of the pilots were put on board ships. The four were: Lawrence Jackson, boatkeeper, age 20; Lawrence Keech, boatkeeper, age 20; John Rogers, Perth Amboy, New Jersey, age 28; Enon Russell, New York, cook, age 23. The John McKeon was last seen on the 20th off Montauk Point Light. Captain John B. H. Ward was last the pilot that left the John McKeon to board the outgoing brig Aladdin''.
 
The New York pilot boat Gratitude, No. 3, was lost in the same storm.

See also
 List of Northeastern U. S. Pilot Boats

References 

   

Service vessels of the United States
Individual sailing vessels
1938 ships
Schooners of the United States
Pilot boats